Maximiliano Pereiro Zugarramurdi (born August 17, 1990 in Montevideo) is an Uruguayan football player who pays for Albion FC.

Career
Pereiro, the 1.78-meter tall defender  played in a total of 23 games for Rampla Juniors in the Primera División across the  2010–11 and 2011–12 seasons; he did not score any goals in either season. He was then transferred into the second list in Sud América, but rose from the Segunda División to the highest Uruguayan league at the end of the 2012–13 season. In the following Premier Season he participated in 26 league games. During the current 2015–16 season until now (February 2, 2016) he has played in 15 Premier League games. He has not been succeeded by anyone in the first league in Sud América.

References

External links

1990 births
Uruguayan footballers
Living people
Association football defenders
Rampla Juniors players
Sud América players
Guillermo Brown footballers
Uruguayan Primera División players
Primera Nacional players
Uruguayan Segunda División players
Uruguayan expatriate sportspeople in Argentina
Uruguayan expatriate footballers
Expatriate footballers in Argentina
Footballers from Montevideo